Chilled may refer to:

Chilled food
Chilled, 2nd album of Ministry of Sound Anthems 2008
Chilled (EP)